The 2001 WGC-World Cup took place 15–18 November at the Taiheiyo Club, Gotemba Course in Gotemba, Shizuoka Prefecture, Japan. It was the 47th World Cup and the second as a World Golf Championship event. 24 countries competed and each country sent two players. The prize money totaled $3,000,000 with $1,000,000 going to the winning pair. The South African team of Ernie Els and Retief Goosen won in a sudden-death playoff over teams from Denmark, New Zealand and the United States.

Qualification and format
18 teams qualified based on the Official World Golf Ranking and were six teams via qualifiers.

The tournament was a 72-hole stroke play team event with each team consisting of two players. The first and third days were fourball play and the second and final days were foursomes play.

Teams

Source

Scores

Playoff
First hole: Denmark and South Africa advance with birdies, New Zealand and the United States eliminated
Second hole: South Africa wins with par

Source

References

World Cup (men's golf)
Golf tournaments in Japan
Sport in Shizuoka Prefecture
WGC-World Cup
World Cup golf